Morteza Haeri Yazdi  (October 12, 1916 – March 16, 1986) was the son of Shia Islam Faqīh Abdul-Karim Haeri Yazdi.

Education 
He attended seminary in Qom, and was educated by professors such as Mohammad-Reza Golpaygani, Mohammad Taqi Khansari and Seyyed Mohammad Mohaghegh Damad.
Abdul-Karim Haeri Yazdi died in 1937.

Death 
Morteza Haeri Yazdi died on the night of March 16, 1986, in Qom and was buried in the shrine of Fātimah bint Mūsā.

Professors 
 Mohammad-Reza Golpaygani
 Mohammad Taqi Khansari
 Seyyed Mohammad Mohaghegh Damad
 Khalil Kamareyi
 Seyyed Hossein Borujerdi
 Ruhollah Khomeini

Students 
 Seyyed Ali Milani
 Mohammad Mehdi Rabbani Amlashi
 Mohammad Reyshahri
 Mohammad Momen

See Also 

 List of Ayatollahs

References 

1916 births
1986 deaths
People from Arak, Iran
Iranian Shia scholars of Islam
Burials at Fatima Masumeh Shrine